Madhya Pradesh State Highway 31 (MP SH 31) is a State Highway running from Nayagaon (Madhya Pradesh-Rajasthan Border) till Khargone.

It passes through Neemuch, Mandsaur, Jaora, Ratlam, Badnawar, Dhar, Dhamnod, Kasrawad.

Recently, the High Court Bench, Indore had directed the operator, not to collect tolls on SH-31 until it is repaired.

See also
List of state highways in Madhya Pradesh

References

State Highways in Madhya Pradesh